Saint Helena, Ascension and Tristan da Cunha is a British Overseas Territory in the South Atlantic, consisting of the island of Saint Helena, Ascension Island and the archipelago of Tristan da Cunha including Gough Island. Their communications provision includes dedicated radio and television stations, and telecommunications infrastructure.

Much of the preceding telecommunications infrastructure between Saint Helena and Ascension was laid in 1899 by the Eastern Telegraph Company, later Cable & Wireless plc, as part of the British need to track the Second Boer War.

Saint Helena
There are three active radio stations on Saint Helena and one company, Sure South Atlantic, that provides "broadband, mobile phone, national & international telephone, public Internet and television re-broadcast services". The company's monopoly is based on a contract with the government that is in force until 31 December 2022.

A January 2021 new item stated that the island has been relying on a "single 7.6-meter satellite dish to connect the island’s residents to the rest of the world" and added that an undersea cable was being laid.

A news release issued eighteen months earlier had notified islanders that the government had signed "a letter of intent to connect St Helena to the Equiano subsea cable project" to get "the first fibre optic connectivity". The release suggested that St Helena might get broadband service "as early as August 2021" if all went well with the installation project. The government believed that this option would provide the "most cost effective growth of bandwidth needs".

The January 2021 news items stated that new telecom regulations were being drafted; there was a "possibility of issuing a license to a different provider after Sure’s term expires".

Radio
Radio St Helena, which started operations on Christmas Day 1967, provided a local radio service that had a range of about 60 miles (100 km) from the island, and also broadcast internationally on Shortwave Radio (11092.5 kHz) on one day a year.  The station presented news, features and music in collaboration with its sister newspaper, the St Helena Herald.  It closed on 25 December 2012 to make way for a new three-channel FM service, also funded by St. Helena Government and run by the South Atlantic Media Services (formerly St. Helena Broadcasting (Guarantee) Corporation).

SAMS provides two radio channels to St Helena. SAMS Radio 1 is a music and entertainment channel; SAMS Radio 2 is a relay of the BBC World Service. SAMS also produces a weekly newspaper, The Sentinel, and formerly made a weekly TV news broadcast.

Saint FM provided a local radio service for the island which was also available on internet radio and relayed in Ascension Island. The station was not government funded. It was launched in January 2005 and closed on 21 December 2012. It broadcast news, features and music in collaboration with its sister newspaper, the St Helena Independent (which continues).

Saint FM Community Radio took over the radio channels vacated by Saint FM and launched on 10 March 2013.  The station is legally a company registered by guarantee and is owned by its members.  Anyone who wishes to can become a member. The station, branded as "The Heartbeat" is also available via the TuneIn app.

As of 1997, there were 3,000 radios in the area.

Television
Sure South Atlantic Ltd offers television for the island via 15 digital encrypted DVB-T2 channels, which rebroadcast a compilation of British programmes provided by South African MultiChoice, at a monthly subscription rate of £33.
In late 2011 a digital broadcasting network using the DVB-T2 standard was installed on the island, which has since replaced the old analogue broadcasting of 3 encrypted TV channels. All 15 digital TV channels are encrypted and subscription costs amount to £33 per month (excl. SHG Service Tax), more than one tenth of an average worker's salary.
The feed signal is received by a satellite dish at Bryant's Beacon from Intelsat 7 in the Ku band. 
Two separate local TV channels will be allocated to carry local content. As of 1997, there were 2,000 television sets in the territory.

Telecommunications
Sure South Atlantic Ltd (formerly Cable & Wireless South Atlantic Ltd) provide the telecommunications service in the territory through a digital copper-based telephone network including ADSL-broadband service. In August 2011 the first fiber-optic link has been installed on the island, which connects the television receive antennas at Bryant's Beacon to the Cable & Wireless Technical Centre in the Briars. Plans are now being made for further fibre optic cable installations.

A satellite ground station with a 7.6-metre satellite dish installed in 1989 at The Briars is the only international connection providing satellite links through Intelsat 707 to Ascension island and the United Kingdom. Since all international telephone and internet communications are relying on this single satellite link both Internet and telephone service are subject to sun outages.

Telephone service
As of 2009 there were 2,900 main telephone lines in use on St Helena. Since 2006 it shares its international calling code +290 with Tristan da Cunha. Since October 2013 telephone numbers are 5 digits long. Numbers start with 1–9, with 8xxxx being reserved for Tristan da Cunha numbers and 22xxx for Jamestown.

Mobile service
Following an agreement signed between the St Helena Government and Cable & Wireless South Atlantic (now Sure South Atlantic Ltd) in July 2012 a GSM mobile phone network was set to be rolled out on St Helena by 2014. In April 2014 installation of an islandwide cellular network had started which was due for launch before end of the year. However, after the contracted network equipment supplier, Altobridge, went into receivership on 30 May 2014, Sure South Atlantic Ltd had to restart the procurement process, postponing the launch date to June 2015. Instead of deploying the aging GSM standard, as originally planned, the company than considered immediately rolling out a cellular network based on the more advanced LTE standard.

In September 2015, Sure South Atlantic Ltd finally launched St Helena's first cellular network using the MCC/MNC tuple 658–01. It is based on network equipment from Canadian Star Solutions International Inc. providing GSM-900 and LTE band 3 (1800 MHz) and Primal Technologies providing Advance Pay/Prepaid, SMSC, Voicemail, USSD, IVR, CTS service.
The network will cover 95% of the population and services will include voice calls, text messaging, mobile data as well as inbound and outbound roaming.

Internet
Until 2012, St Helena's internet link via Intelsat 707 delivered by Cable & Wireless International UK provided a total bandwidth of 10/3.6 Mbit/s. In July 2012 Cable & Wireless South Atlantic announced bandwidth to be doubled to 20 Mbit/s, followed by a further doubling in December 2013 which results in a bandwidth for the entire population of approximately 40 Mbit/s download and 14.4 Mbit/s upload respectively.

There are few public Wi-Fi hotspots in Jamestown, which are also operated by Sure South Atlantic Ltd.

As of 2009, the territory had 900 internet users; there were 6,873 internet hosts as of 2010, and one ISP.

Diane Selkirk of The Independent wrote that "internet is slow and costly enough that only the most dedicated teenager keeps up on celebrity gossip."

Submarine cable link
Since 2012 a campaign called Move This Cable – Connect St Helena! has been lobbying for a branch of the planned South Atlantic Express submarine communications cable to land on St Helena in order to provide high-speed Internet access and so to foster the island's socio-economic development.

On 27 October 2017 the St Helena Government announced the signing of a Memorandum of Understanding (MOU) with South Atlantic Express (SAEx) to provide a branching spur to St Helena from the South Atlantic Express submarine cable between South Africa and South America, with the aim of the cable being ready for service in 2020.

Since the SAEx project had not materialized by July 2019 St Helena Government issued a letter of intent to Google to connect St Helena through a 1140 km long branch from the company's planned Equiano submarine cable to be completed by August 2021.

Satellite Earth station
In February 2018 St Helena Government launched the project to attract operators of satellite ground stations to the island who would lease capacity on the planned submarine cable for backhauling and so contribute to the operational costs of the latter. Satellite ground stations on St Helena could support communications with satellites in low Earth orbit, including those in polar, equatorial and inclined orbit and with high-throughput satellites in medium Earth as well as Geostationary orbit.

Ascension

Telecommunications
Since 2012 Ascension has a cellular network based on the GSM standard which covers Georgetown, Wideawake Airfield, Travellers Hill and Two Boats Village. However services are not marketed locally but instead only offered to visitors using their home operators' international roaming service.

Tristan da Cunha

Telecommunication
Although Tristan da Cunha shares the +290 code with St. Helena, residents have access to the Foreign and Commonwealth Office Telecommunications Network, provided by Global Crossing. This uses a London 020 numbering range, meaning that numbers are accessed via the UK telephone numbering plan. Internet access was available in Tristan da Cunha from 1998 to 2006, but its high cost made it almost unaffordable for the local population, who primarily used it only to send email. The connection was also extremely unreliable, connecting through a 64 kbit/s satellite phone connection provided by Inmarsat.

Since 2006, a very-small-aperture terminal has provided 3072 kbit/s of publicly accessible bandwidth via an internet cafe. As of 2016, there is not yet any mobile telephone coverage on the islands.

Amateur radio
Amateur radio operator groups sometimes conduct DX-peditions on the island. One group operated as station ZD9ZS in September–October 2014.

Meteorological stations
South Africa maintains a manned meteorological station on Gough Island; on Saint Helena island, there is an automatic weather station at Longwood and another station at Broad Bottom.
Ascension Island has four meteorological stations: in the Airhead, Georgetown, Travellers and Residency.

See also
Transport on Saint Helena
Saint Helena, Ascension and Tristan da Cunha#Communications
:Category:Radio stations in Saint Helena

References

Society of Saint Helena, Ascension and Tristan da Cunha
Communications in the United Kingdom
Saint Helena, Ascension and Tristan da Cunha